The M101 Group is a loose group of galaxies located in the constellation Ursa Major.  The group is named after the brightest galaxy in the group, the Pinwheel Galaxy (M101).  Most of the other members of the group are companions of the Pinwheel Galaxy.  The group itself is one of many located within the Virgo Supercluster (i.e. the Local Supercluster).

Members

The table below lists galaxies that have been consistently identified as group members in the Nearby Galaxies Catalog, the survey of Fouque et al., the Lyons Groups of Galaxies (LGG) Catalog, and the three group lists created from the Nearby Optical Galaxy sample of Giuricin et al.

Other possible members galaxies (galaxies listed in only one or two of the lists from the above references) include the irregular galaxies NGC 5238 and UGC 8508.

Nearby groups

The M51 Group, which includes the Whirlpool Galaxy (M51) and the Sunflower Galaxy (M63), is located to the southeast of the M101 Group, and the NGC 5866 Group is located to the northwest.  The distances to these three groups (as determined from the distances to the individual member galaxies) are similar, which suggests that the M51 Group, the M101 Group, and the NGC 5866 Group are actually part of a single large, loose, elongated group.  However, most group identification methods (including those used by the references cited above) identify these three groups as separate entities.

See also

 Virgo Cluster

References

 
Virgo Supercluster
Ursa Major (constellation)